The Return of the Battleship is a 1996 Russian-Belorussian comedy film directed by Gennadi Poloka.

Plot 
The film tells about a man who does a lot of funny things, for example, marries a prostitute to re-educate her, challenges the criminal world and faces the famous Sergei Eisenstein.

Cast 
 Mikhail Urzhumtsev as Iogann Gerts
 Lyudmila Potapova as Klavdiya
 Elena Mayorova as Verka  
 Alexander Lenkov as Verka's boyfriend  
 Vladimir Sterzhakov as Lyubim Avdeyevich Polishchuk
 Ivan Bortnik as Syrovegin
 Tatyana Vasileva as Lizaveta
 Valentin Burov as Kovbasyuk
 Georgiy Shtil as Solomon Getman
 Armen Dzhigarkhanyan as Filipp
 Boris Novikov as Pikeinyj zhilet
 Igor Kvasha as Mikitov-Razumnik
 Aleksey Buldakov as  Pankrat
 Georgy Martirosyan as Lev
 Valery Nosik as Khan-Suleiman
 Igor Dmitriev as Bizon-Nemigailo
 Boris Brunov as Fedya Boyarov
 Yaroslav Boyko as worker from the Eisenstein's film crew
 Gennadi Poloka as film director
 Ivan I. Krasko as episode
 Elena Obraztsova as cameo

References

External links 
 

1996 films
1990s Russian-language films
Russian comedy films
1996 comedy films
Lenfilm films
Belarusfilm films
Gorky Film Studio films
Films based on Russian novels
Films set in the 1920s
Belarusian comedy films